Pinedale is a town in and the county seat of Sublette County, Wyoming, United States. The population was 2,030 at the 2010 census. Pinedale is an important hunting outfitting town and a gateway to the Wind River Mountains. It is also a major gateway to the Jackson Hole area in Wyoming.  Additionally, Pinedale is near several large natural gas fields, including the Pinedale Anticline and Jonah Field.  Attractions include the Museum of the Mountain Man, Green River Rendezvous Days, White Pine Ski Area, the Pinedale Aquatic Center and the Town Park System along the Pine Creek Corridor in the middle of town.  The mayor is Matt Murdock, who was elected in 2018.

Geography and climate
Pinedale is located at  (42.866162, −109.864622) and sits at an elevation of 7,175 feet above sea level.

There are 1,300 lakes around the Pinedale area. Fremont Lake, four miles from Pinedale, is the most commonly used lake, and Wyoming's second largest natural lake.

Pine Creek flows from nearby Fremont Lake through the town on its way to the Green River.

Pinedale has a humid continental climate (Köppen Dfb) with summers featuring warm afternoons and cold mornings, plus very cold, dry winters. The coldest temperature on record since records started in 1948 is  during the bitter cold wave of December 1990.

Wildlife
Pinedale and the surrounding area are home to a large population of wildlife including both grizzly and black bear, moose, elk, pronghorn, mule deer, whitetail deer, bighorn sheep, and mountain lions. Over seven species of trout, including rainbow and brown can be found in the area lakes.

Demographics

2010 census
As of the census of 2010, there were 2,030 people, 847 households, and 484 families residing in the town. The racial makeup of the town was 90.5% White, 0.7% African American, 0.6% Native American, 1.3% Asian, 4.8% from other races, and 2.0% from two or more races. Hispanic or Latino people of any race were 9.9% of the population.

There were 847 households, of which 30.1% had children under the age of 18 living with them, 44.9% were married couples living together, 8.4% had a female householder with no husband present, 3.9% had a male householder with no wife present, and 42.9% were non-families. 31.4% of all households were made up of individuals, and 8.2% had someone living alone who was 65 years of age or older. The average household size was 2.37 and the average family size was 2.96.

The median age in the town was 33.5 years. 23.1% of residents were under the age of 18; 9.6% were between the ages of 18 and 24; 33.2% were from 25 to 44; 24.9% were from 45 to 64; and 9.1% were 65 years of age or older. The gender makeup of the town was 54.8% male and 45.2% female.

2000 census
As of the census of 2000, there were 1,412 people, 582 households, and 368 families residing in the town. The population density was 996.5 people per square mile (383.9/km2). There were 718 housing units at an average density of 506.7 per square mile (195.2/km2). The racial makeup of the town was 96.95% White, 0.35% African American, 0.71% Native American, 0.14% Asian, 0.14% Pacific Islander, 0.42% from other races, and 1.27% from two or more races. Hispanic or Latino people of any race were 1.49% of the population.

There were 582 households, out of which 32.0% had children under the age of 18 living with them, 52.4% were married couples living together, 7.4% had a female householder with no husband present, and 36.6% were non-families. 30.1% of all households were made up of individuals, and 8.9% had someone living alone who was 65 years of age or older. The average household size was 2.30 and the average family size was 2.89.

In the town, the population was spread out, with 24.6% under the age of 18, 6.3% from 18 to 24, 26.6% from 25 to 44, 26.3% from 45 to 64, and 16.1% who were 65 years of age or older. The median age was 39 years. For every 100 females, there were 100.0 males. For every 100 females age 18 and over, there were 97.8 males.

The median income for a household in the town was $35,188, and the median income for a family was $40,880. Males had a median income of $31,976 versus $22,143 for females. The per capita income for the town was $20,441. About 7.8% of families and 8.9% of the population were below the poverty line, including 5.5% of those under age 18 and 10.4% of those age 65 or over.

Education
Public education in the town of Pinedale is provided by Sublette County School District #1. Schools serving the town include Pinedale Elementary School (grades K–5), Pinedale Middle School (grades 6–8), and Pinedale High School (grades 9–12).

Tourism
The region offers many outdoor activities with its close proximity to the Wind River Range.  These activities include fishing, hiking, camping, boating, four-wheeling, hunting, skiing/snowboarding, snowmobiling, ice fishing, and ice skating. The town hosts the Green River Rendezvous, a reenactment of historic fur trader gatherings at the Upper Green River Rendezvous Site in nearby Daniel. During Rendezvous, rodeos take place at the rodeo grounds and many businesses and vendors set up booths around town.

Hazards

Encountering bears is a concern in the Wind River Range. There are other concerns as well, including bugs, wildfires, adverse snow conditions and nighttime cold temperatures.

There have been notable incidents, including accidental deaths, due to falls from steep cliffs (a misstep could be fatal in this class 4/5 terrain) and due to falling rocks, over the years, including 1993, 2007 (involving an experienced NOLS leader), 2015 and 2018. Other incidents include a seriously injured backpacker being airlifted near SquareTop Mountain in 2005, and a fatal hiker incident (from an apparent accidental fall) in 2006 that involved state search and rescue.

References

External links

 Town website
 Pinedale Roundup Online
 Pinedale Online
 Pinedale community message board
 Chamber of Commerce
 Socioeconomics of Sublette County
 www.visitpinedale.org - travel and tourism information

Towns in Sublette County, Wyoming
Towns in Wyoming
County seats in Wyoming